Sar Murd-e Isi (also Romanized as Sar Mūrd-e ʿĪsī) is a village in Abezhdan Rural District, Abezhdan District, Andika County, Khuzestan Province, Iran. At the 2006 census, its population was 48, in 8 families.

References 

Populated places in Andika County